The Standard Fourteen is an automobile which was produced by the British Standard Motor Company from 1945 to 1948.

The Fourteen was offered as a four-door saloon on a 100-inch wheelbase with a  side valve four-cylinder engine. Drophead coupe and estate car variants were also offered. The post-war model could be distinguished from its predecessor by a lack of bonnet louvres.

This Standard Fourteen  is a modified prewar 12 hp car fitted with a 14 hp engine option. The engine and transmission from the Fourteen were also used in the Jaguar 1½ Litre (retrospectively known as the Jaguar Mk IV).

Press reports praised the economy, smooth running, roominess and finish of the Fourteen. Luggage was relegated to an external folding bumper carrier, which at the time was not unusual.

References

External links
Standard Motor Club
Standard Flying Eight Tourer Site

Fourteen
Cars introduced in 1945
Sedans
Rear-wheel-drive vehicles
Coupés